2001 Calcutta Women's Football League was the 9th season of the Calcutta Women's Football League.

The season consisted of twelve teams divided into two groups. The top four teams of each group would qualify for the knockouts where they would face each other in the quarterfinals. This was the first season that Kolkata giants East Bengal and Mohun Bagan formed and fielded their women's teams with East Bengal clinching the final 1–0 against Mohun Bagan to lift their first-ever title. Shanta Dhara scored the winning goal in the final.

Teams

Group stage

Group A

Matches

Group B

Matches

Knockout stage

Qualified teams
The top four placed teams from each of the two groups qualified for the knockout stage.

Bracket

Quarter-finals

Matches

Semi-finals

Matches

Final

Summary
The 2001 Calcutta Women's Football League final was held at the Rabindra Sarobar Stadium on 16 March 2001 between Kolkata giants Mohun Bagan and East Bengal, in the very first season of their formation. This match would thus remain recorded as the first-ever women's Kolkata Derby between the two teams. East Bengal women's team clinched the match 1–0 courtesy of a solitary goal from forward Shanta Dhara in the twenty-third minute of the game as East Bengal held onto the lead and lifted their first-ever Calcutta Women's Football League title.

Match

References 

2001–02 domestic women's association football leagues